Iowa Highway 86 (Iowa 86) is a state highway that runs from north to south in northwest Iowa.  It begins at U.S. Highway 71 (US 71) in northern Milford and ends at the Minnesota border northwest of Spirit Lake, where it continues onward as Minnesota State Highway 86.

Route description
Iowa Highway 86 begins at an intersection with US 71 north of Milford.  It heads westward from this point before turning northward, passing through Wahpeton.  It continues northward, passing along West Okoboji Lake along the way.  West of Spirit Lake, it intersects with IA 9.  Further north, it reaches the Minnesota state border, where the highway terminates.  It continues into Minnesota as MN 86.

History
Prior to its current alignment, the highway was originally designated as Iowa Highway 32.  In February 1981, Iowa 32 was decommissioned from US 71 north of Milford to Iowa 9 west of Spirit Lake.  The road was also extended from Iowa 9 northward to the Minnesota border.  The old alignment of Iowa 32 was renumbered as the present day Iowa 86.  In 2013, Iowa 86 was reconstructed north of Iowa 9 to the Minnesota state line.  The project consisted of reducing the severity of the two sharp curves located at the state line, right-of-way widening, and "flattening" the road by cutting down the high points and filling in the low points.

Major intersections

References

External links

End of Iowa 86 at Iowa Highway Ends

086
Transportation in Dickinson County, Iowa